Saint-Georges-Buttavent is a commune in the Mayenne department in north-western France.

The commune has three villages : Saint-Georges-Buttavent, Fontaine-Daniel and La-Chapelle-au-Grain.

See also
Communes of the Mayenne department

References

Saintgeorgesbuttavent